Anthony Bernard McCoy (born June 10, 1969) is an American former college and professional football player who was a defensive tackle in the National Football League (NFL) for nine seasons during the 1990s and early 2000s.  McCoy played college football for the University of Florida, and thereafter, he played professionally for the Indianapolis Colts and the Arizona Cardinals of the NFL.

Early years 

McCoy was born in Orlando, Florida in 1969.  He attended Maynard Evans High School in Orlando, and played high school football for the Evans Trojans.

College career 

McCoy accepted an athletic scholarship to attend the University of Florida in Gainesville, Florida, where he played for coach Galen Hall and coach Steve Spurrier's Florida Gators football teams from 1988 to 1991.  As a senior in 1991, McCoy was a key member of the Florida defense as the Gators won their first-ever official Southeastern Conference (SEC) football championship; he was recognized as a first-team All-SEC selection and an honorable mention All-American, and was selected by his fellow Gators as the team's most valuable player.  He finished his college career with seventeen quarterback sacks.

McCoy returned to Gainesville after his NFL career was over and completed his bachelor's degree in sociology in 2001.

Professional career 

In his nine-year NFL career, McCoy started seventy-nine of 114 games in which he played, and finished his professional career with twenty-three quarterback sacks and three recovered fumbles.

Life after football 

McCoy received his minister's license through the United Christian Church and Ministerial Association in 1996.  He currently serves as the senior pastor of Hope International Church, a non-denominational Christian church located in Groveland, Florida.

See also 

 Florida Gators football, 1980–89
 Florida Gators football, 1990–99
 History of the Indianapolis Colts
 List of Florida Gators in the NFL Draft
 List of University of Florida alumni

References

Bibliography

 Carlson, Norm, University of Florida Football Vault: The History of the Florida Gators, Whitman Publishing, LLC, Atlanta, Georgia (2007).  .
 Golenbock, Peter, Go Gators!  An Oral History of Florida's Pursuit of Gridiron Glory, Legends Publishing, LLC, St. Petersburg, Florida (2002).  .
 Hairston, Jack, Tales from the Gator Swamp: A Collection of the Greatest Gator Stories Ever Told, Sports Publishing, LLC, Champaign, Illinois (2002).  .
 McCarthy, Kevin M.,  Fightin' Gators: A History of University of Florida Football, Arcadia Publishing, Mount Pleasant, South Carolina (2000).  .
 Nash, Noel, ed., The Gainesville Sun Presents The Greatest Moments in Florida Gators Football, Sports Publishing, Inc., Champaign, Illinois (1998).  .

1969 births
Living people
People from Groveland, Florida
Players of American football from Orlando, Florida
American football defensive tackles
Florida Gators football players
Indianapolis Colts players
Arizona Cardinals players
Ed Block Courage Award recipients